Sphaerotilus natans is an aquatic periphyton organism associated with polluted water.  It forms colonies commonly known as "sewage fungus", but later identified as tightly sheathed filamentous bacteria.

Morphology
Straight or smoothly curved filaments 1.5 µm in diameter and 100 to more than 500 µm in length are formed by rod-shaped cells with clear septa growing within a long, tubular sheath.  An adhesive basal element at one end of the filament can aid attachment to solid surfaces.  The sheath offers some protection from predators, and the ability to anchor in flowing water allows access to a passing stream of food and nutrients.  Individual mature cells swarm out of the protective tube to colonize new sites.  Each motile mature cell has an intertwined bundle of flagella appearing as a single flagellum consisting of a long filament with a short hook and a basal body complex, but it is distinguishable by electron microscope as 10 to 30 strands with diameters of 12.5 to 16 nm each. S. natans stores reserves of poly- beta -hydroxybutyrate as internal globules making up 30 to 40% of the dry weight of a colony.   Gram and Neisser staining reactions are negative.

Habitat
S. natans requires dissolved simple sugars or organic acids as a food supply, but needs less phosphorus than many competing organisms and can tolerate low oxygen concentrations.  Capability to deposit elemental sulfur intracellularly in the presence of hydrogen sulfide is believed to be a detoxifying mechanism.  S. natans requires either cobalamin or methionine as a trace nutrient.  S. natans filaments can aid development of a periphyton biofilm trapping suspended particles and stabilizing colonies of other organisms including Klebsiella and Pseudomonas.

Significance
Sphaerotilus natans is often associated with a buoyant floc (or "bulking sludge") causing poor solids separation in activated sludge clarifiers of secondary sewage treatment.  Metal surfaces covered with S. natans may experience accelerated corrosion if the slime creates a barrier causing differential oxygen concentrations.  S. natans slimes may reduce quality of paper produced by paper mills using recycled water streams.

References

Further reading
 Betz Laboratories Handbook of Industrial Water Conditioning (7th Edition) Betz Laboratories (1976)
 Fair, Gordon Maskew, Geyer, John Charles & Okun, Daniel Alexander Water and Wastewater Engineering (Volume 2) John Wiley & Sons (1968)
 Hammer, Mark J. Water and Waste-Water Technology John Wiley & Sons (1975)

External links
Type strain of Sphaerotilus natans at BacDive -  the Bacterial Diversity Metadatabase

Aquatic ecology
Gram-negative bacteria
Comamonadaceae
Water pollution